Rudolf Bruus (1 February 1916 Berdiansk, Taurida Governorate – 16 March 2005) was an Estonian military personnel (Lieutenant Colonel).

In 1938 he graduated from the military school in Estonia. In 1941 he started to fight for German military forces. He was the commander of a German battalion.

Awards:
 1997: Order of the Cross of the Eagle, II class.

References

1916 births
2005 deaths
people from Berdiansk
People from Berdyansky Uyezd
Estonian military officers
Soviet military personnel of World War II
Estonian Waffen-SS personnel
Soviet prisoners and detainees
Recipients of the Iron Cross (1939), 1st class
Recipients of the Iron Cross (1939), 2nd class
Recipients of the Military Order of the Cross of the Eagle, Class II